Dibrova, Ternopil Oblast may refer to:

Dibrova — Saranchuky Hromada; former Berezhany Raion
Dibrova — Vyshnivets Hromada; former Zbarazh Raion, Kokhanivka Rural Council
Dibrova — Zbarazh Hromada; former Zbarazh Raion, Shyly Rural Council
Dibrova — Kremenets Hromada; former Kremenets Raion
Dibrova — Koropets Hromada; former Monastyryska Raion